Serrodes trispila is a moth of the family Erebidae first described by Paul Mabille in 1890.

Distribution
It is found in subtropical Africa where it had been recorded from Cameroon the Republic of the Congo, Ethiopia, Ivory Coast, Sao Tomé, Sierra Leone, South Africa, Madagascar, Réunion and Mauritius.

The larvae had been recorded on Doratoxylon aptealum (Sapindaceae).

References

Serrodes
Moths of Africa
Moths described in 1890